Mordellistena dieckmanni is a species of beetle in the genus Mordellistena of the family Mordellidae. It was described in 1963 by Ermisch. and can be found in such European countries as Austria, Bulgaria, Croatia, Finland,  France, Germany, Greece, Hungary, Poland, Slovakia, Slovenia and Switzerland.

References

dieckmanni
Beetles described in 1963
Beetles of Europe